Imperio Club de Fútbol was a Spanish football club based in Madrid.

History
Founded in 1923 under the name of Imperio Foot-Ball Club, the club changed its name to Imperio Club de Fútbol in 1940 due to the new language rules in all country.

After playing the 1939–40 season in Segunda División (which ended in relegation) Imperio eventually served as Atlético Madrid's reserve team for one year. In 1943 the club achieved promotion to Tercera División, but folded after four years.

Season to season

1 season in Segunda División
4 seasons in Tercera División

External links
ArefePedia team profile 

Football clubs in Madrid
Defunct football clubs in the Community of Madrid
Association football clubs established in 1923
Association football clubs disestablished in 1947
1923 establishments in Spain
1947 disestablishments in Spain
Segunda División clubs